Autumn Dynasty is a real-time strategy game developed by Singaporean studio Touch Dimensions, that used to be published by Bulkypix.

Critical reception
The game has a Metacritic score of 85% based on 12 critic reviews.

References

External links
 Official site
 Touch Dimensions site

2012 video games
Android (operating system) games
BlackBerry games
BulkyPix games
IOS games
Real-time strategy video games
Single-player video games
Video games developed in Singapore